Bouka is a 1988 drama film directed by Roger Gnoan M'Bala.

Synopsis
Bouka is a gifted young teenager. He lives with his parents in a village and forms with them a solid family. His father gives him a traditional education close to nature. Unfortunately this happiness will be troubled by the brutal death of the father… Remained widow Bouka's mother will suffer the consequences of a relentless traditional principle. She becomes the new wife of the nephew of her late husband, Bouka doesn't accepts this new condition of her mother. He suspects his stepfather to be involved in his father's death. He stops to go to school and organizes a gang in the forest. In this tormented atmosphere, he develops a mortal hate towards its new "father"… According to M'Bissine Diop, "Bouka" is the first film where Roger Gnoan M'Bala deals with the issue of the Western influence on local culture.

Awards
 1st Prize at Vues d'Afrique, Canada (1989) 
 1st Prize at Festival de Belfort, France (1989) 
 Sankofa Prize at FESPACO - Panafrican Film and Television Festival of Ouagadougou, Burkina Faso (1989)
 Prize ID des Arts et Lettres, Ivory Coast (1989)
 Public Prize at Festival d'Angers, France (1989)

See also
 Roger Gnoan M'Bala 
History of Cinema in Ivory Coast

External links
Bouka - IMDb page about Bouka
Bouka at Africultures.
Article (in French) in Film l'Afrik

References

Ivorian drama films
1988 films
1988 drama films